Erik Napoleon Söderlund (11 April 1925 – 27 July 2009) was a Swedish race walker. He competed in the 50 km event at the 1960 Summer Olympics, but failed to finish. He placed fifth over 20 km at the 1961 IAAF World Race Walking Cup, where his twin brother Åke won a bronze medal in the 50 km walk.

References

1925 births
2009 deaths
Athletes (track and field) at the 1960 Summer Olympics
Olympic athletes of Sweden
Swedish male racewalkers
Athletes from Stockholm
20th-century Swedish people
21st-century Swedish people